Charles B. Hudson may refer to:

Charles Britton Hudson (born 1974), the lead guitarist of the US rock band Blue October
Charles B. Hudson, writer for Conde McGinley's newspaper "Common Sense"